The British German Legion (or Anglo-German Legion) was a group of German soldiers recruited to fight for Britain in the Crimean War. It is not to be confused with the King's German Legion, which was active during the Napoleonic Wars. Great Britain raised a British German Legion of two regiments of light dragoons, three Jäger Corps, and six regiments of light infantry; a British Italian Legion of five regiments of infantry, and a British Swiss Legion of three regiments of light infantry. At the end of the war, the soldiers were entitled to return to their country of origin at the public expense, but some, fearing a hostile reception at home, settled in the Cape of Good Hope.

The leader of the legion was Major General Richard von Stutterheim.

The British government funded and gave material support to von Stutterheim to recruit soldiers into the legion. In March 1855, von Stutterheim began raising the legion by hiring 200 agents in Germany to recruit soldiers, focusing mostly on port cities. The recruiters would go to taverns, buy beer for young men and recruit them once they were inebriated. It is believed that Stutterheim was paid $40 for each recruit, paying $20 to each recruit and pocketing the other $20, thereby earning himself $120,000 in the process.

In 1856, members of the legion were billeted at Barrack field in Colchester Garrison, where many married local women.

It was disbanded November 1856, having seen little or no military action due to the war having ended. Facing difficulties in repatriation by having served a foreign country, most of members of the legion were resettled in the Eastern Cape Colony, in South Africa.  As a result, to this day there are place names of German origin in the area around King William's Town, including the town of Stutterheim.

Bibliography

References

External links
 
  (incorrectly refers to the "King's German Legion")

1856 disestablishments in the United Kingdom
Regiments of the British Army
19th-century military history of the United Kingdom